The BMW M5 is a high performance variant of the BMW 5 Series marketed under the BMW M sub-brand. It is considered an iconic vehicle in the sports sedan category. The majority of M5s have been produced in the sedan (saloon) body style, but in some countries the M5 was also available as a wagon (estate) from 1992 to 1995 and from 2006 to 2010.

The first M5 model was hand-built in 1985 on the E28 535i chassis with a modified engine from the M1 that made it the fastest production sedan at the time. M5 models have been produced for every generation of the 5 Series since 1985.

E28 M5 (1984–1988)  

The first BMW M5, based on the E28 5 Series, was manufactured from October 1984 to June 1988. It made its debut at the Amsterdam Motor Show in February 1985. It was based on the 535i chassis with various mechanical changes, most notably the M88/3 engine (shared with the E24 M635CSi grand tourer coupé) which was an updated version of the engine used in the M1 sports car. At its launch, the E28 M5 was the fastest production sedan in the world.

The official markets for the E28 M5 were Europe, Great Britain, the United States, Canada, and South Africa.

Due to an extended production run that exceeded BMW's original forecast of production volumes, a class action lawsuit was launched by owners in the United States. Production of North American specification M5 commenced in November 1986 and ended in November 1987.

Aside from 96 cars which were assembled in kit form at BMW's Plant in Rosslyn, South Africa, all cars were assembled by hand in Germany. Assembly took place at BMW Motorsport's plant in Preussenstrasse in Munich prior to the 1986 factory summer vacation. Thereafter, the M5 production was moved to Daimlerstrasse in Garching where the remainder were built. Production of the M5 continued until November 1988, almost a year after BMW had ceased production of regular E28 models. With a total production of 2,241 units, the E28 M5 remains among the rarest regular production BMW Motorsport cars – after the M1 (456 units), M5 (E34) Touring (891 units) and the 850CSi (1,510 units).

E34 M5 (1988–1995)  

The E34 generation of the M5 was produced from September 1988 to August 1995. Powered by the S38 straight-six engine, an evolution of the previous generation's straight-six, it was initially produced in a sedan body style, with a LHD Touring (wagon/estate) version following in 1992.

Production of M5 models began with the painted bodyshell of an E34 5 Series at the BMW Dingolfing plant. The shells were then transported to BMW M GmbH in Garching, where the car was assembled by hand over a period of two weeks. Only the South African M5 was entirely assembled at the Rosslyn, South Africa assembly plant from complete knock-down kits supplied from Garching, Germany. The M5 Touring, which was BMW M Division's first wagon as well as the last hand-built M car, saw 891 units produced. Total production of the E34 M5 was 12,254 units, of which 8,344 were 3.5-litre and 3,910 were 3.8-litre. In the North American market, only the 3.5-litre version was sold (model years 1991–1993).

Cosmetic changes to the exterior from the standard E34 included unique front and rear bumpers and side rocker panels, contributing to a drag coefficient of 0.32 (from 0.30), and interior updates included a unique gearshift surround and rear headrests.

Updates 

In late 1991 (1992 model year), the engine was upgraded to the 3.8-litre S38B38, with exception to North America and South Africa, which continued with the 3.5-litre engine due to emission laws. BMW also used a dual-mass flywheel in place of the single in the 3.5-litre version for a smoother idle and throttle input at the expense of response. The standard self-leveling suspension (SLS) system, which maintained a constant ride height in the rear, was replaced with Electronic Damper Control (EDCIII+), an electronically controlled and hydraulically regulated system that can switch between comfort "P" setting and a more track-oriented "S" setting.

A 6-speed Getrag 420G manual transmission was introduced in 1994.

M-System wheels 
The M5 came with an unusual wheel design. From 1988 to 1992 the M5 featured the three-piece Style 20 "M-System" wheels, which consisted of magnesium, unidirectional bolted-on wheel covers and an aluminum assembly with concentric fins that bolt on to the front of the black, 5-spoke forged aluminum wheel. According to BMW, the cover increased outside airflow to the brake assembly by 25 percent to improve cooling.

In 1992 BMW changed the design to the "M-System II" (nicknamed "throwing stars") which improved brake cooling from the combination of the larger openings and fins placed in the driving direction.

In May 1994, the M5 switched to 18-inch Style 37 "M Parallel" wheels that did away with the finned cover entirely.

Special editions
There were four special editions of the E34 M5. The Cecotto, Winkelhock and 20 Jahre editions which were offered as LHD Euro specification models while the RHD UK Limited edition was only sold in the United Kingdom.

In 1991, BMW asked two race drivers to design their "ideal" version of the E34 M5. The Cecotto Edition M5, named after Johnny Cecotto, featured severy luxury items fitted, including Nappa leather for the steering wheel and heated seats. A total of 22 Cecotto E34 M5s were produced with options of having either Lagoon Green metallic (code number 266) and Mauritius Blue metallic paint (code number 287) and Light Parchment or Light Silvergrey upholstery for the interior.

The other M5 special edition dedicated to a race driver was the Winkelhock Edition, named after touring car driver Joachim Winkelhock. The resulting car was a lightweight M5 stripped of some amenities. The Winkelhock Edition features a smaller battery, the reduced US-spec 81-litre fuel tank, reduced sound deadening, and deletion of non-essential items such as rear headrests, vanity mirrors, rear window switches and foglights. The Recaro front seat design, suede-covered 385mm M-Technic II steering wheel, shift knob and parking brake handle, and red seatbelts were similar to those on the BMW E30 M3 Sport Evolution. A total of 51 Winkelhock E34 M5s were produced with the options of having Jet Black (code number 668) with contrasting lower body panels in Sterling Silver metallic paint (code number 244).

The 20 Jahre Motorsport Edition was built to celebrate BMW Motorsport's 20th anniversary in 1992. Twenty cars were produced, all Euro-spec 3.8-litre models. Offered only in Mugello Red (code number 274), the anniversary edition had a number of aesthetic trim upgrades such as carbon fiber dash panels, red seat belts embroidered with "BMW Motorsport," and M-Technic rear-view mirrors. Unique seat center & door trim fabric were matched with Alcantara, which was also used on the steering wheel, shift lever & parking brake lever.

The UK Limited Edition was produced from March to June 1995, to commemorate the end of right-hand drive E34 M5 production. Fifty cars were produced, in one of two color and trim combinations: Rosso Red metallic (code number 369) with a Champagne extended leather interior and natural poplar wood trim (15 built) or Orinoco metallic (code number 406) with a Bicolour Petrol and Mint extended leather interior and graphite bird's-eye maple wood trim (35 built). Each E34 M5 Limited Edition is equipped with the three-spoke sport steering wheel, Shadowline trim, power sunroof, power front seats, headlight washers and manual air conditioning. A numbered plaque appears on the center console.

Additionally, 20 M5 Touring Elekta models were assembled for distribution in Italy in 1995. These were finished in either Sterling Silver over Marine Blue leather, or British Racing Green over Tobacco leather and featured extended leather interior as well as unique, numbered shift knobs. It is debated as to whether or not these cars constitute a true special edition as they were ordered directly by a group of Italian BMW dealers.

BMW developed a prototype convertible model, which featured an electric folding cloth roof and a steeper raked windshield than a standard M5. Steel reinforcements were added under both side valance panels to reduce body flex, and curb weight was approximately  more than the sedan model. The prototype was never given the green light for production due to financial considerations.

Motorsport
BMW Australia entered an E34 M5 in the Australian 1992 Bathurst 12 Hour Production Car endurance race, placing 2nd overall, and 1st in its class. It was driven by former F1 champion Alan Jones, Neville Crichton, and BMW Touring car driver Tony Longhurst.

E39 M5 (1998–2003) 

It is also the first M5 to use aluminium front suspension components and a multi-link rear suspension. Production began in October 1998.

Production totalled to 20,482 cars from 1999 to 2003. Unlike its predecessors, the M5 was produced on the same assembly line as the regular 5 Series models at the Dingolfing factory in Germany.

The E39 M5 recorded a Nürburgring lap time of 8:20.

The M5 received the September 2000 facelift (for the 2001 model year) at the same time as the standard E39 models. Changes included halogen "corona rings" in headlights (often called "Angel Eyes"), LED tail-lights and various interior upgrades. The mechanical specification was unchanged. For the subsequent two model years, changes were limited to the addition of new exterior colours (from September 2001) and the upgrade to a DVD-based navigation system (from September 2002).

Production of a "Touring" (wagon/estate) E39 M5 model was evaluated by BMW, and at least one prototype was developed (in Titanium Silver with a Black Exclusive leather interior). However the Touring did not reach production, due to financial considerations.

Engine 
The S62 engine has electronically actuated individual throttle bodies, an aluminium block and heads, variable valve timing (double-VANOS), and a semi-dry sump oil system.

Drivetrain 
The transmission is the Getrag 420G six-speed manual, as used in the E39 540i but with an upgraded clutch due to the increased torque. The differential uses a shorter 3.15:1 ratio, and is a limited slip differential with 25% maximum locking.

Chassis 
The E39 M5 uses aluminium-intensive MacPherson strut front suspension and multi-link rear suspension, as per the other V8 models of the E39 5 Series range. However, several changes were made by BMW M. Reduced spring height,  lower. A specific shock valving, thicker front and rear anti-roll bars, polyurethane auxiliary springs, and steel balljoints.

Although the six-cylinder E39 models use rack-and-pinion steering, the M5 (and other V8 models) retains the recirculating ball steering system, as used by previous generations of the M5. A quicker steering ratio of 14.7 was used, compared with 17.9 for other V8 models. It featured a Servotronic vehicle-speed-sensitive power assist which provides two levels of resistance controlled via console mounted Sport button. The Sport button also adjusted the electronic throttle butterflies for more sensitive response.

Brake discs (rotors) are a "floating" two-piece design (except for U.S. and Canada models), for reduced risk of cone distortion. Their lower unsprung weight improves ride quality and traction on bumpy surfaces as well.

E60/E61 M5 (2004–2010)  

The E60 M5 was introduced in 2004, with a V10 engine and 7-speed paddle-shift SMG (Sequential Manual Gearbox) transmission linking the car with the BMW Sauber Formula One program. The E60 M5 was the world's first production sedan to use a V10 gasoline engine. This generation of the M5 was also built in the E61 Touring (wagon) body style, which was only sold in Europe. The E63/E64 M6 coupé and convertible are based on a shortened version of the M5 chassis and largely use the same mechanical components.

The official 0 to  acceleration figure is 4.7 seconds for the sedan, however magazine tests have recorded figures down to 4.1 seconds. Unrestricted top speed of 205 mph. The M5 has recorded a Nürburgring lap time of 8:13.

Upgrades over regular 5 Series models include a wider track, unique body panels, a colourful heads up display featuring navigation, control messages, speed, rpm and gear selection information, automated seat side bolsters, heated/ventilated seats and power rear curtain. The larger, flared front guards on either side also featured cooling vents, reminiscent of the 1970s BMW CSL. The wheels were of 19-inch diameter and the car has quad exhaust pipes at the rear.

During its five-year production run, 20,589 units were built: 19,564 sedans and 1,025 Touring. The biggest market was the United States with 8,800 cars (sedans only), followed by Great Britain and Ireland with 1,776 cars and Germany with 1,647 cars.

The M5 model was designed by Karl John Elmitt and produced at the BMW Plant Dingolfing in Germany. The E60 M5 did not offer safety features such as automatic radar braking or lane departure warning, which was offered on the E60 5 Series that were not on the M5.

Engine 

The S85 was exclusively used in the E60 M5 (and related E63/E64 M6) and is not based on any other engine.

P500 increases power to the full . The P500 S mode keeps the engine at the same power output as the P500 mode but adds a more sensitive throttle response.

This engine is well known for its rod bearing failures, the stock bearings not providing sufficient clearance (the S65 from the E9X series M3, being based on the S85, shares the issue), which can lead to catastrophic engine failure if it is not addressed. Another major issue with this engine is the throttle actuators, which is usually attributed to the gears located inside the actuators, however, electronic failure of the actuators themselves is not uncommon.

Transmission 
The M5 uses the SMG-III 7-speed single-clutch automated manual transmission, that performs gear shifts in 65–250 milliseconds, depending on the gear shifting mode.
 The SMG-III includes launch control, a hill holder, shift-lock avoidance (by briefly disengaging the clutch during downshifts) and an automatic shift mode. However, many reviews have observed the automatic mode of the transmission at low or frequent stop start speeds as being less smooth than that of a conventional automatic transmission.

In North America, a conventional six-speed manual transmission was announced in October 2006. The SMG-III remained the default transmission in North America, while the manual was available as a no cost option. The six-speed manual M5 was marginally slower in certain tests, as the dynamic stability control could not be disengaged unlike the SMG version (however this was later made possible and a retrofit was released for earlier cars). In North America, the launch control for SMG transmissions is set at 1,500 rpm, instead of the 4,000 rpm used in other regions.

F10 M5 (2011–2016)  

The F10 M5 was unveiled at the 2011 Frankfurt Motor Show and sales began in November 2011. It is powered by a twin-turbocharged V8 engine, making it the first turbocharged M5 model. The gearbox in most markets is a 7-speed Getrag (now Magna) 7DCI600 dual-clutch transmission marking the first time an M5 has used a dual-clutch automatic transmission. A traditional 6-speed manual transmission was also available in the United States.

The F10 M5 has a reported Nürburgring lap time of 7:55.

An Active M-Differential provides torque vectoring between the rear wheels, which are 19-inches in standard trim. Optional 20-inch wheels are fitted with 265/35/20 front and 295/30/20 rear Michelin Pilot Super Sport tyres. Standard brakes are 6-piston front calipers with carbon ceramic brakes optional. The F10 M5 weighs , which is  more than its predecessor. The F10 M5 was praised for its improved gearbox and fuel economy; however, the engine sound, steering feel and increased weight were criticised.

The M5 was produced alongside regular 5 Series models at the BMW Dingolfing Plant in Germany. Production ended in October 2016.

From 2014, the BMW M5 Competition Package was introduced.

M Performance Parts 
M Performance Parts include an M Performance exhaust, a carbon fibre spoiler, a sport steering wheel, sport pedals, side skirts, a diffuser and carbon fibre mirrors.

Special editions
To celebrate BMW M5 30th anniversary in 2015, BMW had built 300 special edition models, named "30 Jahre BMW M5". All 300 cars came in BMW special edition paint in the Individual colour shade called the Frozen Dark Silver metallic. On the interior, "30 Jahre M5" is embroidered on the front door sill finishers and the seat backrests, and plaque bearing "30 Jahre M5" and "1/300" inscriptions is placed on the dashboard.

In 2016, pure metal silver edition was built, 50 special edition models.

F90 M5 (2017–present)  

The F90 M5 is based on the G30 5 Series and uses an all-wheel drive ("xDrive") powertrain, being the first time that an M5 has not been rear-wheel drive. However the all-wheel drive system is biased towards the rear wheels. It can also be configured to send power to the rear wheels only, if the electronic stability control (ESC) is disabled. The transmission is an 8-speed ZF GA8HP75Z automatic.

The exterior of the M5 was designed by Seungmo Lim. The car was unveiled at the Gamescom in August 2017, to promote the launch of Need for Speed Payback. The M5 was also shown at the Frankfurt Motor Show (IAA) in September 2017. The M5 is produced alongside regular 5 Series models at the BMW Dingolfing Plant in Germany.

The standing quarter mile is achieved in 10.9 seconds, making this iteration of the M5 a 10-second car. Despite the added weight of the all-wheel drive components, the weight of the F90 M5 is approximately  lower than the previous generation M5.

In December 2017, the F90 M5 set the Guinness World Records for "Longest continuous vehicle drift" and "Longest twin vehicle drift (water assisted)" on a wet skidpad, with distances of  respectively. The F90 M5 recorded a Nürburgring lap time of 7:38.92 in a test by Sport auto.

M5 Competition

The official zero to  acceleration time was reduced by 0.1 seconds compared with the regular M5 meaning zero to  takes 3.1 seconds in accordance with BMW. Other changes include stiffer springs, increased front camber, a  lower ride height, revised wheels and a redesigned exhaust system with a particulate filter added. In a test by sport auto the M5 Competition lapped the Nürburgring in 7:35.90.

Engine and transmission 
The engine is an evolution of the S63 from the previous generation.

The transmission is the eight-speed ZF 8HP automatic transmission. The F90 is the first M5 to use a torque converter automatic transmission (compared with the previous generation's dual-clutch transmission), which BMW states was chosen for its durability and because shift times are not significantly slower than a dual-clutch transmission.

Special editions
BMW made a 400 units special edition for its debut of the F90 M5 with an individual Frozen Dark Red Metallic color with an individual smoke white interior and an individual Piano Black wood trim with a "1/400" inscription right below the iDrive control knob. BMW called it the First Edition M5 and oddly enough they were produced Mid-2018.

To celebrate the 35th anniversary of the M5 in 2019, BMW had built 350 units of the "35 Jahre M5". All 350 cars came in BMW special edition paint in the Individual colour shade called the BMW Individual Frozen Dark Grey II. On the interior, "35 Jahre M5" is embroidered on the front door sill finishers and the seat backrests, and plaque bearing "35 Jahre M5" and "1/350" inscriptions is placed on the dashboard.

M5 CS 
This is the first ever CS version of the M5,  the car entered production in March 2021. Its notable differences include:
 Engine power increased by further  to 
 It weighs  making it  lighter than the regular M5.
 It has four bucket-style seats, with the famous Nürburgring circuit logo printed on the headrests.
 It has a special trim with extensive Gold Bronze detailing.
 Two heat extractor vents in the bonnet.

Carbon fibre is used extensively on the M5 CS because it is both lightweight and strong. The brakes are 23 kg lighter than those on the BMW M5 Competition. In total, the carbon fibre parts contribute to a near 70 kg weight reduction over the BMW M5 Competition. Carbon Fibre Reinforced Plastic (CFRP) is used for the bonnet, the front splitter, exterior mirror caps, rear spoiler on the bootlid and the rear diffuser.

Facelift

The F90 M5 facelift was unveiled in June 2020 for the 2021 model year. Major highlights of the facelift included revised headlamps and taillamps with the headlamps featuring a minimalist L shaped design for the daytime running lights. The front bumper and rear bumpers were also redesigned, now featuring an overall sharp design. The base model didn't receive any mechanical changes while the M5 Competition now has revised shock absorbers and tuning for the adjustable suspension system. The variant also gets a new "Track" mode which when enabled shuts off all driver aids and the infotainment system for a more focused driving experience. Five new exterior colours were added to the colour options which include Motegi Red, Brands Hatch Grey, Tanzanite Blue II, Individual Aventurine Red and Frozen Bluestone.

On the interior, the M5 now has a 12.3-inch infotainment display replacing the previous 10.25-inch unit. The system was also upgraded to iDrive 7.0 from the previous NBT EVO ID6. New features for the infotainment system include wireless Android Auto functionality, natural speech recognition, and BMW's cloud-based navigation that provides faster route calculations and more up-to-date traffic information. Two new upholstery options were added to the interior those being black leather and beige Alcantara upholstery. The facelift M5 was made available for sale in August 2020.

M Performance Parts 
The M5 can be fitted with M Performance Parts which are the ones used in the CS. These include a splitter, side skirts, spoiler, diffuser and carbon fibre parts.

See also

 BMW 5 Series
 BMW M3
 BMW M6

References

M5
Rear-wheel-drive vehicles
Sports sedans
Station wagons
Cars introduced in 1985
1990s cars
2000s cars
2010s cars
2020s cars